James Paul Clarke is a marble sculpture depicting the American politician of the same name by Pompeo Coppini, installed in the United States Capitol's National Statuary Hall Collection, in Washington, D.C., as one of two statues gifted by the U.S. state of Arkansas.  The 6 foot 10 inch tall statue  was placed in the Hall in 1921. The work cost $7,500. and was unveiled in Washington in 1921.

See also
 1921 in art

References

External links
 

1921 establishments in Washington, D.C.
1921 sculptures
Marble sculptures in Washington, D.C.
Monuments and memorials in Washington, D.C.
Clarke, James Paul
Sculptures of men in Washington, D.C.